Livin' in Hysteria is the second album by Heavens Gate, released on April 2, 1991, by No Remorse Records and later reissued by SPV GmbH.

Track listing

Personnel
Band members
 Thomas Rettke – lead vocals, co-producer
 Sascha Paeth – guitar, co-producer
 Bonny Bilski  – guitar
 Manni Jordan – bass
 Thorsten Müller – drums

Additional musicians
Miro - piano on "The Best Days of my Life"

Production
Charlie Bauerfeind - producer, engineer, mixing
Richard Corben - cover art

References

1991 albums
SPV/Steamhammer albums